Masto is a surname. Notable people with the surname include:

 Catherine Cortez Masto (born 1964), American lawyer and politician
 Raffaele Masto (1953–2020), Italian journalist

See also